The Nagel House, located at 1411 Wilson St. in Great Bend, Kansas, is a Lustron house built in 1950.  It was listed on the National Register of Historic Places in 2001.

It is a Newport Deluxe model of Lustron house. It was built by Brack Implements, the Great Bend distributor for Lustron.

See also
Abel House, another NRHP-listed Lustron house in Great Bend

References

National Register of Historic Places in Barton County, Kansas
Houses completed in 1950
Lustron houses in Kansas